The North Staffordshire and South Cheshire Premier Cricket League is the top level of competition for recreational club cricket in the North Staffordshire and South Cheshire area of England, and the league Headquarters is based in Stoke on Trent. The league was founded in 1964 and since 2001 it has been a designated ECB Premier League.

Champions

Championships won

Performance by season from 2001

References

External links
 Official play-cricket website

English domestic cricket competitions
ECB Premier Leagues